is a Japanese manga series written and illustrated by Hatsumi Kodama. It was first irregularly published in Kodansha's seinen manga magazine Morning from May 2020 to July 2021, and has also been published on the online platform Comic Days since May 2020.

Publication
Written and illustrated by Hatsumi Kodama, Zange Meshi started its irregular serialization in Kodansha's seinen manga magazine Morning on May 7, 2020; the series started publication on the Comic Days online platform on August 5 of the same year, and the series continued its irregular publication in Morning until July 21, 2021. Kodansha has collected its chapters into individual tankōbon volumes. The first volume was released on December 9, 2020. As of September 14, 2022, six volumes have been released.

Volume list

References

Further reading

External links
  
  

Cooking in anime and manga
Japanese webcomics
Kodansha manga
Romantic comedy anime and manga
Seinen manga
Webcomics in print